Bedminster is a district of Bristol, England, on the south side of the city. It is also the name of a council ward which includes the central part of the district.

The eastern part of Bedminster is known as Windmill Hill. To the south is Bedminster Down. Southville ward is also part of Bedminster.

History
Bedminster was once a small town in Somerset. The town's origins seem to be Roman, centred on the present East Street and West Street. Finds here have been interpreted as an enclosed rural farmstead, dating between the 2nd and 4th centuries, but with possible Iron Age origins. The river Malago, which runs through Bedminster to join the Avon, was an early Christian place for baptisms — the old word for which, beydd may be the origin of Bedminster's name.
Substantial Roman remains have also been found at Bedminster Down, including plaster, tesserae (hence mosaic floors), sandstone roof tiles, coins and pottery, hence the site is thought to be a Roman Villa occupied by the Romano-British.

By the late Anglo-Saxon period Bedminster was a manor held by King Edward the Confessor in the 11th century, and in the Domesday Book of 1086 was still in royal hands. The Royal Manor of Bedminster comprised all the land south of the Avon, from the Avon Gorge to Brislington, and in the Domesday Book had 25 villeins, 3 slaves and 27 smallholders. In 1154 it was given to the Lords of Berkeley, who kept it for 300 years. In 1605 it was purchased by the Smyth family of Ashton Court who remained the Lords of the Manor until the 19th century.

The parish of Bedminster was part of the hundred of Hartcliffe.

In 1644, during the English Civil War, Bedminster was sacked by Prince Rupert. When John Wesley preached there in the 1760s, it was a sprawling, decayed market town, with orchards next to brickworks, ropewalks and the beginnings of a mining industry.

Open cast coal mining had been done on a small scale since the 1670s, but in 1748 the first shafts were sunk by Sir Jarrit Smyth at South Liberty Lane. By the end of the century there were eighteen coal-pits operating in the Bedminster and Ashton Vale coalfield.

Between 1804 and 1809 the New Cut was excavated through the northern part of the parish from Temple Meads to Hotwells, providing a new course for the River Avon, enabling the original course to be held at a constant level so that shipping could stay afloat in Bristol Harbour, now known as the Floating Harbour. In addition to removing the tides, the new cut also helped with reducing silting in the harbour. It is now the boundary between Bedminster and the City centre.

In 1840 the shipbuilder Acramans, Morgan and Co  opened the Bedminster Yard on the New Cut, to build a number of steam ships including two large vessels for the Royal Mail Steam Packet Company, the 2,000 tonne Avon and Severn in 1842. In 1862 John Payne Ltd took over the yard, then known as the Vauxhall Yard, and continued to build coastal cargo ships, and small craft such as tugs. They closed in 1925, and the site was taken over by Bristol Metal Welding and Spraying Company, who are still in business there today.

The population of Bedminster increased rapidly, from 3,000 in 1801 to 78,000 in 1884, mostly as a result of the coalfield and industries such as smelting, tanneries, glue-works, paint and glass factories. In the 1880s two major employers moved there – E. S. & A. Robinson (paper bag manufacturers) and W.D. & H.O. Wills (cigarette and cigar makers). The population overflowed to Windmill Hill, Totterdown, Southville, the Chessels and Bedminster Down. During this time, churches, public houses, shops and businesses were built, some of which still survive.

Victoria Park was laid out at the north of Bedminster in the late 1880s to provide recreational facilities for the new housing development.

In World War II, Bedminster was one of several areas of Bristol that were heavily bombed during the Bristol Blitz. Post-war town planning relocated most of the heavy industry to the rural areas to the south of the parish, and new estates grew up in Withywood, Hartcliffe and Highridge.

Bedminster, New Jersey, chartered by King George II in 1748, was named after Bedminster in Bristol.

Education
There is one Children's Nursery and five primary schools in Bedminster:

 North Street Nursery
 Holy Cross RC Primary School
 Parson Street Primary School
 Victoria Park Primary School
 Compass Point: South Street School and Children's Centre (known as South Street Primary School before April 2010)
 Oasis Academy Marksbury Road

And one secondary school, Bedminster Down School.

Transport 
The two main shopping streets in Bedminster, East Street and North Street, form part of the A38 road, extending from Bedminster Bridge over the New Cut to Bedminster Down.

The Bristol to Exeter railway line passes through Bedminster, and there are two railway stations, Bedminster and Parson Street. The former Ashton Gate station used to serve the Ashton area and Bristol City F.C.

Sport and recreation
Bedminster is home to many sports teams, including Broad Plain Rugby Club, who play in the Bristol Combination league, and Bedminster Cricket Club, which was founded in 1847 and has historical links with W. G. Grace, who play in the West of England Premier League. Broad Plain RFC are based at Bristol South End, off St Johns Lane, which was the home of Bristol City Football Club before they moved to Ashton Gate, and later the sports and social club associated with E. S. & A. Robinson.

Bedminster is home to one of Bristol's two city farms, below Windmill Hill, and also the national headquarters for the Federation of City Farms. Opposite the city farm is Bristol's Hackspace, a shared workshop for electronics and robotics hobbyists.

A greyhound racing track called the Magnet Racecourse was opened on 9 June 1928, on South Liberty Lane, Long Ashton. The racing was independent (not affiliated to the sports governing body the National Greyhound Racing Club) known as a flapping track, which was the nickname given to independent tracks. The NGRC refused to license the Magnet Greyhound Racing Company because the district already had licensed tracks at Eastville Stadium and Knowle Stadium. Racing was held as many as five times per week on what was described as a horse-shoe shape with the main distance being 475 yards. The track closed on 26 August 1932.

Council ward 
The Bedminster council ward does not include the northern part of Bedminster, which is in Southville ward. Nor does it include the area east of the railway line, which is in Windmill Hill ward. Bedminster Down is in Bishopsworth ward. Bedminster ward does include the district of Ashton Vale, to the south of Bedminster.

Ashton Vale

Ashton Vale includes an area of housing centred on Ashton Drive and South Liberty Lane, served by Ashton Vale Primary School.  The northern part of Ashton Vale, adjacent to the Portishead Railway line, is mixed light industrial and retail outlets.

Politics
The Bedminster council ward elects two members of Bristol City Council. Celia Phipps and Mark Bradshaw are the current ward councillors, both of whom are members of the Labour Party.

Bedminster is part of the Bristol South constituency, whose MP is Karin Smyth of the Labour Party since 2015.

Notable people
 Alfred Dancey, murderer at the age of fourteen, transported to Australia
 Princess Caraboo, impostor, lived as a widow in Bedminster. She died on 24 December 1864 and was buried in the Hebron Road.
 Florence Mary Taylor, pioneering Australian architect and aviatrix, born in Bedminster in 1879.
 Jayde Adams, British comedian, actress, writer and singer, was born in Bedminster in 1984.

References

External links
 Ashton Vale Community Site 
The Tale of Two Bedminsters - UK and New Jersey

Map of Bedminster circa 1900

Areas of Bristol
Wards of Bristol
Places formerly in Somerset